Meridian is an unincorporated community in McIntosh County, Georgia, United States. Meridian has a post office with ZIP code 31319.

References

Unincorporated communities in McIntosh County, Georgia
Unincorporated communities in Georgia (U.S. state)
Populated coastal places in Georgia (U.S. state)